Masalikatti is a village in Dharwad district of Karnataka, India.

Demographics 
As of the 2011 Census of India there were 124 households in Masalikatti and a total population of 743 consisting of 395 males and 348 females. There were 104 children ages 0-6.

References

Villages in Dharwad district